Luan Nieuwoudt (born 17 April 1995 in Pretoria, South Africa) is a South African rugby union player, currently playing with the  and Varsity Cup side . His regular position is centre.

Career

Nieuwoudt attended Kroonheuwel Primêre Skool in Kroonstad, earning an inclusion in the  Under-13 squad that played at the Craven Week competition in 2008.

He then relocated to the Eastern Cape where he attended Humansdorp school Hoërskool Nico Malan. Here, he was selected to represent Eastern Province at the Under-16 Grant Khomo Week in 2011 and at the Under-18 Craven Week competitions in both 2012 and 2013, scoring a try against the Free State in their first match of the 2013 competition.

After the 2013 Craven Week tournament, Nieuwoudt also became involved with the s that played in the 2013 Under-19 Provincial Championship. He started their final two matches of the regular season to help them finish third and qualify for the semi-finals. He played in both the semi-final – where they beat  in Wellington – and the final, which Eastern Province won by beating  56–40 in Nelspruit to win the Group B title. Nieuwoudt also started their promotion play-off match against , helping them to a 27–20 victory and winning promotion to Group A.

He made his first class debut and played over an hour of the match as they lost 3–31 to their rivals from Bloemfontein.

Still eligible to play at Under-19 level, he returned to that side for their first season in Group A of the 2014 Under-19 Provincial Championship. He started ten of their matches and scored a try in their match against  as they finished in sixth position in Group A.

References

South African rugby union players
Living people
1995 births
Rugby union players from Pretoria
Rugby union centres
Eastern Province Elephants players